Monte Sant'Angelo is a town and comune of Apulia, southern Italy, in the province of Foggia, on the southern slopes of Monte Gargano.

History
Monte Sant'Angelo as a town appeared only in the 11th century. Between 1081 and 1103, Monte Sant'Angelo was the capital of a large Norman dominion under the control of Count Henry, who was a vassal of the Byzantine Empire. The grotto which houses the Sanctuary of Saint Michael the Archangel where according to legend, St. Michael appeared in 490, 492 and 493, has been the site of many famous pilgrimages, which started from Mont Saint-Michel. Pope John Paul II visited the sanctuary in 1987.

In the 17th century the city became part of the Kingdom of Naples, to which it belonged until the unification of Italy in 1861.

Main sights
The most important attraction of Monte Sant'Angelo is the Sanctuary of Monte Sant'Angelo, built in the 13th century by Charles I of Anjou.
On June 25, 2011 the World Heritage Committee added the Sanctuary of San Michele Arcangelo in Monte Sant'Angelo to the UNESCO World Heritage List. The Sanctuary is one of the seven groups of historic buildings included in the World Heritage Site "Longobards in Italy. Places of the power (568-774 A.D.)".

Other sights of Monte Sant'Angelo include:
The Castle, with bastions of different ages. The first news on its history dates back to 979; later, it was the residence of Rainulf I of Aversa and the Robert Guiscard, who built the Norman Tower and the Treasure Hall. Emperor Frederick II restored the construction to use it as residence for his mistress Bianca Lancia, while under the Angevins it was used mainly as prison. Later, from 1464 to 1485, the fortress was the residence of the exiled Albanian condottiero Skanderbeg. The castle was largely rebuilt in the late 15th century by Ferdinand I. According to a legend, the castle is currently home to the ghost of Bianca Lancia (popularly known as "Biancalancia"), whose sighs can be heard especially in winter time.
The Tomb of Rothari (Baptistry of San Giovanni in Tumba), a baptistery dating back from the 12th century accessible from the 18th century of St. Peter. The portal has notable reliefs with Biblical stories.
The church of Santa Maria Maggiore (11th and 12th centuries). The façade has blind arcades and a baldachin portal with sculpted frames. The interior has a nave and two aisles, divided by columns with sculpted capitals. The walls have Byzantine-style frescoes.
It was built in 591 over a Pagan temple and was largely destroyed by an earthquake in 1646.

Economy
Monte Sant'Angelo's economy is still largely based on agriculture and breeding. A certain tourist importance is related to the presence of the Sanctuary of Saint Michael the Archangel.

Employment
The majority of the working population own farmland, raise cattle, run bakeries, restaurants, or stores. Often stores and businesses are family owned.

The population of Monte Sant'Angelo remains relatively small due to lack of employment in town. Often, young men leave to find work elsewhere. Due to this the majority of the population is retired and elderly.

Transportation
Monte Sant'Angelo can be reached by road through the Foggia-Monte Sant'Angelo SP.55 provincial road. The SP.89 provincial road passes through the frazione of Macchia.

International relations

 
Monte Sant'Angelo is twinned with:
 
 San Michele Salentino, Italy (since 2007)
 Vallecorsa, Italy (since 2009)
 Mont Saint-Michel, France (since 2010)
 San Giovanni Rotondo, Italy (since 2013)
 Bari, Italy (since 2013)
 Assisi, Italy (since 2013)
 Andria, Italy (since 2013)
 Alberobello, Italy (since 2013)

See also
Monte Sant'Angelo Castle
Pulsano Abbey

References

External links

Official website
News Il giornale di monte
Gallery of images 
The Castle 
image gallery  
montesantangelo.com – City guide of Monte Sant'Angelo

Cities and towns in Apulia
Burial sites of the Harodingian dynasty